The 2016 Winter Cup was an artistic gymnastics competition held at the Cashman Center in Las Vegas from February 18 to February 20, 2016.

Competition
The finals session featured the top 42 gymnasts according to their all-around ranking and the top three gymnasts on each apparatus. The all-around and individual event champions were determined via a combined two-day score. Performances at the Winter Cup helped determine eight men who comprised the United States men's national gymnastics team at the 2016 U.S. National Gymnastics Championships.

Medalists

References

U.S. Winter Cup
Gymnastics
Winter Cup
Winter Cup
Winter Cup